Richard Grant Augustus Donnelly (March 4, 1841 – February 27, 1905) was an  American Democratic politician who served as Mayor of Trenton, New Jersey from 1884 to 1886. He also served as Quartermaster General of New Jersey circa 1903.

He served as Mayor of Trenton, New Jersey from 1884 to 1886. He was president of the Interstate Fair Association from 1895 to 1903. He was replaced by Frank Obadiah Briggs.

References

External links

New Jersey Democrats
Mayors of Trenton, New Jersey
Quartermasters General of New Jersey
1841 births
1905 deaths